The following outline is provided as an overview of and topical guide to games and gaming:

Games – structured or semi-structured activities, usually undertaken for enjoyment. They are usually fun activities that can be educational or purely just for fun. The term "game" is also used to describe simulation of various activities e.g., for the purposes of training, analysis or prediction, etc., see "Game (simulation)".  Games are a universal part of the human experience, for all cultures, genders and ages.  Key components of games are goals, rules, challenge, and interactivity.  Games generally involve mental or physical stimulation, and sometimes both.  Many games help develop practical skills, serve as a form of exercise, or otherwise perform an educational, simulational or psychological role.

Purpose 
Individuals participate in game-play for various reasons, depending upon the aspect the particular game covers. These include:

Education
Learning analytics
Entertainment
Play
Social relation
Pleasure
Hobby
Strategy
Tactics

Types of games

Game components 

 Dice
 Playing card
 Game board (or simply board) – the (usually quadrilateral) surface on which one plays a board game; the namesake of the board game, gameboards would seem to be a necessary and sufficient condition of the genre, though card games that do not use a standard deck of cards (as well as games which use neither cards nor a game board) are often colloquially included. Most games use a standardized and unchanging board (chess, Go, and backgammon all have such a board), but many games use a modular board whose component tiles or cards can assume varying layouts from one session to another, or even as the game is played.

Components of role-playing games 
 Player character

Game play 
 Play
 Player – a participant in a game
 Player-coach

Game development 

Game development
 Dynamic game difficulty balancing
 Dynamic music
 Emergent gameplay
 Evolver (3D Avatar Web Portal)
 Game balance
 Game design
 Game mechanics
 Gameplay
 Gold sink
 House rule
 Impulse-based turn system
 Kingmaker scenario
 Lame duck
 Lusory attitude
 Simultaneous action selection
 Super NES Emulator SE

Game theory 

Game theory
 Branch of applied mathematics
 Cooperative game
 Evolutionary game theory
 Extensive form game
 Information set
 List of games in game theory
 Normal-form game
 Payoff matrix

Lists of games 

 List of board games
 List of cross and circle games
 List of card games
 List of dice games
 List of domino games
 List of party games
 List of role-playing games
 List of sports
 Lists of video games
 List of best-selling video games
 List of traditional children's games

Also see

 Computer
 Game club
 Game semantics
 Lawn game
 Ludology
 Play
 Puzzle
 Sport
 Toy
 List of puzzle topics
 List of impossible puzzles
 List of puzzle-based computer and video games

External links 

  Pop It Fidget Toy Trading Game.

Games
Games
Games
outline